The 2013 Rio Quente Resorts Tennis Classic was a professional tennis tournament played on hard courts. It was the second edition of the tournament which was part of the 2013 ATP Challenger Tour. It took place in Rio Quente, Brazil between 6 and 12 May 2013.

Singles main-draw entrants

Seeds

 1 Rankings are as of April 29, 2013.

Other entrants
The following players received wildcards into the singles main draw:
  Tiago Fernandes
  Wilson Leite
  Bruno Sant'anna
  Nicolas Santos

The following players received entry from the qualifying draw:
  Ariel Behar
  Diego Matos
  Carlos Eduardo Severino
  Marcelo Tebet Filho

Doubles main-draw entrants

Seeds

1 Rankings as of April 29, 2013.

Other entrants
The following pairs received wildcards into the doubles main draw:
  Charles Costa /  Marcos Vinicius Dias
  Eduardo Dischinger /  Tiago Fernandes
  Rodrigo Perri /  Fritz Wolmarans

Champions

Singles

 Rajeev Ram def.  André Ghem, 4–6, 6–4, 6–3

Doubles

 Fabiano de Paula /  Marcelo Demoliner def.  Ricardo Hocevar /  Leonardo Kirche, 6–3, 6–4

External links
Official Website

Rio Quente Resorts Tennis Classic
Rio Quente Resorts Tennis Classic
Rio